The Sun is the star at the center of the Solar System. It is a nearly perfect ball of hot plasma, heated to incandescence by nuclear fusion reactions in its core. The Sun radiates this energy mainly as light, ultraviolet, and infrared radiation, and is the most important source of energy for life on Earth.

Its mass is about 330,000 times that of Earth, comprising about 99.86% of the total mass of the Solar System. Roughly three-quarters of the Sun's mass consists of hydrogen (~73%); the rest is mostly helium (~25%), with much smaller quantities of heavier elements, including oxygen, carbon, neon, and iron.

The Sun is a G-type main-sequence star (G2V). As such, it is informally, and not completely accurately, referred to as a yellow dwarf (its light is actually white). It formed approximately 4.6 billion years ago from the gravitational collapse of matter within a region of a large molecular cloud. Most of this matter gathered in the center, whereas the rest flattened into an orbiting disk that became the Solar System. The central mass became so hot and dense that it eventually initiated nuclear fusion in its core. It is thought that almost all stars form by this process.

Every second, the Sun's core fuses about 600 million tons of hydrogen into helium, and in the process converts 4 million tons of matter into energy. This energy, which can take between 10,000 and 170,000 years to escape the core, is the source of the Sun's light and heat. When hydrogen fusion in its core has diminished to the point at which the Sun is no longer in hydrostatic equilibrium, its core will undergo a marked increase in density and temperature while its outer layers expand, eventually transforming the Sun into a red giant. It is calculated that the Sun will become sufficiently large to engulf the current orbits of Mercury and Venus, and render Earth uninhabitable – but not for about five billion years. After this, it will shed its outer layers and become a dense type of cooling star known as a white dwarf, and no longer produce energy by fusion, but still glow and give off heat from its previous fusion.

The enormous effect of the Sun on Earth has been recognized since prehistoric times. The Sun was thought of by some cultures as a deity. The synodic rotation of Earth and its orbit around the Sun are the basis of some solar calendars. The predominant calendar in use today is the Gregorian calendar which is based upon the standard 16th-century interpretation of the Sun's observed movement as actual movement.

Etymology
The English word sun developed from Old English . Cognates appear in other Germanic languages, including West Frisian , Dutch , Low German , Standard German , Bavarian , Old Norse , and Gothic . All these words stem from Proto-Germanic . This is ultimately related to the word for sun in other branches of the Indo-European language family, though in most cases a nominative stem with an l is found, rather than the genitive stem in n, as for example in Latin , ancient Greek , Welsh  and Czech , as well as (with *l > r) Sanskrit  and Persian .

The principal adjectives for the Sun in English are sunny for sunlight and, in technical contexts, solar, from Latin  – the latter found in terms such as solar day, solar eclipse and Solar System (occasionally Sol system). From the Greek  comes the rare adjective heliac. In English, the Greek and Latin words occur in poetry as personifications of the Sun, Helios and Sol, while in science fiction Sol may be used as a name for the Sun to distinguish it from other stars. The term sol with a lower-case s is used by planetary astronomers for the duration of a solar day on another planet such as Mars.

The English weekday name Sunday stems from Old English  "sun's day", a Germanic interpretation of the Latin phrase , itself a translation of the ancient Greek  'day of the sun'. The astronomical symbol for the Sun is a circle with a center dot, . It is used for such units as M☉ (Solar mass), R☉ (Solar radius) and L☉ (Solar luminosity).

General characteristics
The Sun is a G-type main-sequence star that constitutes about 99.86% of the mass of the Solar System. The Sun has an absolute magnitude of +4.83, estimated to be brighter than about 85% of the stars in the Milky Way, most of which are red dwarfs. The Sun is a Population I, or heavy-element-rich, star. The formation of the Sun may have been triggered by shockwaves from one or more nearby supernovae. This is suggested by a high abundance of heavy elements in the Solar System, such as gold and uranium, relative to the abundances of these elements in so-called Population II, heavy-element-poor, stars. The heavy elements could most plausibly have been produced by endothermic nuclear reactions during a supernova, or by transmutation through neutron absorption within a massive second-generation star.

The Sun is by far the brightest object in the Earth's sky, with an apparent magnitude of −26.74. This is about 13 billion times brighter than the next brightest star, Sirius, which has an apparent magnitude of −1.46.

 is defined as the mean distance of the Sun's center to Earth's center, though the distance varies (by about +/- 2.5 million km or 1.55 million miles) as Earth moves from perihelion on about 03 January to aphelion on about 04 July. The distances can vary between 147,098,074 km (perihelion) and 152,097,701 km (aphelion), and extreme values can range from 147,083,346 km to 152,112,126 km. At its average distance, light travels from the Sun's horizon to Earth's horizon in about 8 minutes and 20 seconds, while light from the closest points of the Sun and Earth takes about two seconds less. The energy of this sunlight supports almost all life on Earth by photosynthesis, and drives Earth's climate and weather.

The Sun does not have a definite boundary, but its density decreases exponentially with increasing height above the photosphere. For the purpose of measurement, the Sun's radius is considered to be the distance from its center to the edge of the photosphere, the apparent visible surface of the Sun. By this measure, the Sun is a near-perfect sphere with an oblateness estimated at 9 millionths, which means that its polar diameter differs from its equatorial diameter by only . The tidal effect of the planets is weak and does not significantly affect the shape of the Sun. The Sun rotates faster at its equator than at its poles. This differential rotation is caused by convective motion due to heat transport and the Coriolis force due to the Sun's rotation. In a frame of reference defined by the stars, the rotational period is approximately 25.6 days at the equator and 33.5 days at the poles. Viewed from Earth as it orbits the Sun, the apparent rotational period of the Sun at its equator is about 28 days. Viewed from a vantage point above its north pole, the Sun rotates counterclockwise around its axis of spin.

Composition

The Sun is composed primarily of the chemical elements hydrogen and helium. At this time in the Sun's life, they account for 74.9% and 23.8%, respectively, of the mass of the Sun in the photosphere. All heavier elements, called metals in astronomy, account for less than 2% of the mass, with oxygen (roughly 1% of the Sun's mass), carbon (0.3%), neon (0.2%), and iron (0.2%) being the most abundant.

The Sun's original chemical composition was inherited from the interstellar medium out of which it formed. Originally it would have contained about 71.1% hydrogen, 27.4% helium, and 1.5% heavier elements. The hydrogen and most of the helium in the Sun would have been produced by Big Bang nucleosynthesis in the first 20 minutes of the universe, and the heavier elements were produced by previous generations of stars before the Sun was formed, and spread into the interstellar medium during the final stages of stellar life and by events such as supernovae.

Since the Sun formed, the main fusion process has involved fusing hydrogen into helium. Over the past 4.6 billion years, the amount of helium and its location within the Sun has gradually changed. Within the core, the proportion of helium has increased from about 24% to about 60% due to fusion, and some of the helium and heavy elements have settled from the photosphere towards the center of the Sun because of gravity. The proportions of heavier elements is unchanged. Heat is transferred outward from the Sun's core by radiation rather than by convection (see Radiative zone below), so the fusion products are not lifted outward by heat; they remain in the core and gradually an inner core of helium has begun to form that cannot be fused because presently the Sun's core is not hot or dense enough to fuse helium. In the current photosphere, the helium fraction is reduced, and the metallicity is only 84% of what it was in the protostellar phase (before nuclear fusion in the core started). In the future, helium will continue to accumulate in the core, and in about 5 billion years this gradual build-up will eventually cause the Sun to exit the main sequence and become a red giant.

The chemical composition of the photosphere is normally considered representative of the composition of the primordial Solar System. The solar heavy-element abundances described above are typically measured both using spectroscopy of the Sun's photosphere and by measuring abundances in meteorites that have never been heated to melting temperatures. These meteorites are thought to retain the composition of the protostellar Sun and are thus not affected by the settling of heavy elements. The two methods generally agree well.

Structure and fusion

Core

The core of the Sun extends from the center to about 20–25% of the solar radius. Recent analysis of SOHO mission data favors a faster rotation rate in the core than in the radiative zone above. Through most of the Sun's life, energy has been produced by nuclear fusion in the core region through the proton–proton chain; this process converts hydrogen into helium. Currently, only 0.8% of the energy generated in the Sun comes from another sequence of fusion reactions called the CNO cycle, though this proportion is expected to increase as the Sun becomes older and more luminous.

The core is the only region in the Sun that produces an appreciable amount of thermal energy through fusion; 99% of the power is generated within 24% of the Sun's radius, and by 30% of the radius, fusion has stopped nearly entirely. The remainder of the Sun is heated by this energy as it is transferred outwards through many successive layers, finally to the solar photosphere where it escapes into space through radiation (photons) or advection (massive particles).

However, each proton (on average) takes around 9 billion years to fuse with one another using the PP chain. Fusing four free protons (hydrogen nuclei) into a single alpha particle (helium nucleus) releases around 0.7% of the fused mass as energy, so the Sun releases energy at the mass–energy conversion rate of 4.26 million metric tons per second (which requires 600 metric megatons of hydrogen), for 384.6 yottawatts, or 9.192 megatons of TNT per second. The large power output of the Sun is mainly due to the huge size and density of its core (compared to Earth and objects on Earth), with only a fairly small amount of power being generated per cubic metre. Theoretical models of the Sun's interior indicate a maximum power density, or energy production, of approximately 276.5 watts per cubic metre at the center of the core, which is about the same power density inside a compost pile.

The fusion rate in the core is in a self-correcting equilibrium: a slightly higher rate of fusion would cause the core to heat up more and expand slightly against the weight of the outer layers, reducing the density and hence the fusion rate and correcting the perturbation; and a slightly lower rate would cause the core to cool and shrink slightly, increasing the density and increasing the fusion rate and again reverting it to its present rate.

Radiative zone

The radiative zone is the thickest layer of the sun, at 0.45 solar radii. From the core out to about 0.7 solar radii, thermal radiation is the primary means of energy transfer. The temperature drops from approximately 7 million to 2 million Kelvin with increasing distance from the core. This temperature gradient is less than the value of the adiabatic lapse rate and hence cannot drive convection, which explains why the transfer of energy through this zone is by radiation instead of thermal convection. Ions of hydrogen and helium emit photons, which travel only a brief distance before being reabsorbed by other ions. The density drops a hundredfold (from 20 g/cm3 to 0.2 g/cm3) between 0.25 solar radii and 0.7 radii, the top of the radiative zone.

Tachocline

The radiative zone and the convective zone are separated by a transition layer, the tachocline. This is a region where the sharp regime change between the uniform rotation of the radiative zone and the differential rotation of the convection zone results in a large shear between the two—a condition where successive horizontal layers slide past one another. Presently, it is hypothesized (see Solar dynamo) that a magnetic dynamo within this layer generates the Sun's magnetic field.

Convective zone

The Sun's convection zone extends from 0.7 solar radii (500,000 km) to near the surface. In this layer, the solar plasma is not dense enough or hot enough to transfer the heat energy of the interior outward via radiation. Instead, the density of the plasma is low enough to allow convective currents to develop and move the Sun's energy outward towards its surface. Material heated at the tachocline picks up heat and expands, thereby reducing its density and allowing it to rise. As a result, an orderly motion of the mass develops into thermal cells that carry the majority of the heat outward to the Sun's photosphere above. Once the material diffusively and radiatively cools just beneath the photospheric surface, its density increases, and it sinks to the base of the convection zone, where it again picks up heat from the top of the radiative zone and the convective cycle continues. At the photosphere, the temperature has dropped to 5,700 K (350-fold) and the density to only 0.2 g/m3 (about 1/10,000 the density of air at sea level, and 1 millionth that of the inner layer of the convective zone).

The thermal columns of the convection zone form an imprint on the surface of the Sun giving it a granular appearance called the solar granulation at the smallest scale and supergranulation at larger scales. Turbulent convection in this outer part of the solar interior sustains "small-scale" dynamo action over the near-surface volume of the Sun. The Sun's thermal columns are Bénard cells and take the shape of roughly hexagonal prisms.

Photosphere

The visible surface of the Sun, the photosphere, is the layer below which the Sun becomes opaque to visible light. Photons produced in this layer escape the Sun through the transparent solar atmosphere above it and become solar radiation, sunlight. The change in opacity is due to the decreasing amount of H− ions, which absorb visible light easily. Conversely, the visible light we see is produced as electrons react with hydrogen atoms to produce H− ions.

The photosphere is tens to hundreds of kilometers thick, and is slightly less opaque than air on Earth. Because the upper part of the photosphere is cooler than the lower part, an image of the Sun appears brighter in the center than on the edge or limb of the solar disk, in a phenomenon known as limb darkening. The photosphere has a particle density of ~1023 m−3 (about 0.37% of the particle number per volume of Earth's atmosphere at sea level). The photosphere is not fully ionized—the extent of ionization is about 3%, leaving almost all of the hydrogen in atomic form.

During early studies of the optical spectrum of the photosphere, some absorption lines were found that did not correspond to any chemical elements then known on Earth. In 1868, Norman Lockyer hypothesized that these absorption lines were caused by a new element that he dubbed helium, after the Greek Sun god Helios. Twenty-five years later, helium was isolated on Earth.

Atmosphere

The Sun's atmosphere is composed of four parts: the photosphere (visible under normal conditions), the chromosphere, the transition region, the corona and the heliosphere. During a total solar eclipse, the photosphere is blocked, making the corona visible.

This part of the Sun is cool enough to allow the existence of simple molecules such as carbon monoxide and water, which can be detected via their absorption spectra.
The chromosphere, transition region, and corona are much hotter than the surface of the Sun. The reason is not well understood, but evidence suggests that Alfvén waves may have enough energy to heat the corona.

It is called the chromosphere from the Greek root chroma, meaning color, because the chromosphere is visible as a colored flash at the beginning and end of total solar eclipses. The temperature of the chromosphere increases gradually with altitude, ranging up to around  near the top. In the upper part of the chromosphere helium becomes partially ionized.

The temperature increase is facilitated by the full ionization of helium in the transition region, which significantly reduces radiative cooling of the plasma. The transition region does not occur at a well-defined altitude. Rather, it forms a kind of nimbus around chromospheric features such as spicules and filaments, and is in constant, chaotic motion. The transition region is not easily visible from Earth's surface, but is readily observable from space by instruments sensitive to the extreme ultraviolet portion of the spectrum.

The corona is the next layer of the Sun. The low corona, near the surface of the Sun, has a particle density around 1015 m−3 to 1016 m−3. The average temperature of the corona and solar wind is about 1,000,000–2,000,000 K; however, in the hottest regions it is 8,000,000–20,000,000 K. Although no complete theory yet exists to account for the temperature of the corona, at least some of its heat is known to be from magnetic reconnection.
The corona is the extended atmosphere of the Sun, which has a volume much larger than the volume enclosed by the Sun's photosphere. A flow of plasma outward from the Sun into interplanetary space is the solar wind.

The heliosphere, the tenuous outermost atmosphere of the Sun, is filled with the solar wind plasma. This outermost layer of the Sun is defined to begin at the distance where the flow of the solar wind becomes superalfvénic—that is, where the flow becomes faster than the speed of Alfvén waves, at approximately 20 solar radii (0.1 AU). Turbulence and dynamic forces in the heliosphere cannot affect the shape of the solar corona within, because the information can only travel at the speed of Alfvén waves. In December 2004, the Voyager 1 probe passed through a shock front that is thought to be part of the heliopause. In late 2012 Voyager 1 recorded a marked increase in cosmic ray collisions and a sharp drop in lower energy particles from the solar wind, which suggested that the probe had passed through the heliopause and entered the interstellar medium, and indeed did so August 25, 2012 at approximately 122 astronomical units from the Sun. The heliosphere has a heliotail which stretches out behind it due to the Sun's movement.

On April 28, 2021, during its eighth flyby of the Sun, NASA's Parker Solar Probe encountered the specific magnetic and particle conditions at 18.8 solar radii that indicated that it penetrated the Alfvén surface, the boundary separating the corona from the solar wind defined as where the coronal plasma's Alfvén speed and the large-scale solar wind speed are equal. The probe measured the solar wind plasma environment with its FIELDS and SWEAP instruments. This event was described by NASA as "touching the Sun". During the flyby, Parker Solar Probe passed into and out of the corona several times. This proved the predictions that the Alfvén critical surface isn't shaped like a smooth ball, but has spikes and valleys that wrinkle its surface.

Sunlight and neutrinos 

The Sun emits light across the visible spectrum, so its color is white, with a CIE color-space index near (0.3, 0.3), when viewed from space or when the Sun is high in the sky. The Solar radiance per wavelength peaks in the green portion of the spectrum when viewed from space. When the Sun is very low in the sky, atmospheric scattering renders the Sun yellow, red, orange, or magenta, and in rare occasions even green or blue. Despite its typical whiteness (white sunrays, white ambient light, white illumination of the Moon, etc.), some cultures mentally picture the Sun as yellow and some even red; the reasons for this are cultural and exact ones are the subject of debate.

The solar constant is the amount of power that the Sun deposits per unit area that is directly exposed to sunlight. Sunlight on the surface of Earth is attenuated by Earth's atmosphere, so that less power arrives at the surface (closer to ) in clear conditions when the Sun is near the zenith. Sunlight at the top of Earth's atmosphere is composed (by total energy) of about 50% infrared light, 40% visible light, and 10% ultraviolet light. The atmosphere in particular filters out over 70% of solar ultraviolet, especially at the shorter wavelengths. Solar ultraviolet radiation ionizes Earth's dayside upper atmosphere, creating the electrically conducting ionosphere.

Ultraviolet light from the Sun has antiseptic properties and can be used to sanitize tools and water. It also causes sunburn, and has other biological effects such as the production of vitamin D and sun tanning. It is also the main cause of skin cancer. Ultraviolet light is strongly attenuated by Earth's ozone layer, so that the amount of UV varies greatly with latitude and has been partially responsible for many biological adaptations, including variations in human skin color in different regions of the Earth.High-energy gamma ray photons initially released with fusion reactions in the core are almost immediately absorbed by the solar plasma of the radiative zone, usually after traveling only a few millimeters. Re-emission happens in a random direction and usually at slightly lower energy. With this sequence of emissions and absorptions, it takes a long time for radiation to reach the Sun's surface. Estimates of the photon travel time range between 10,000 and 170,000 years. In contrast, it takes only 2.3 seconds for the neutrinos, which account for about 2% of the total energy production of the Sun, to reach the surface. Because energy transport in the Sun is a process that involves photons in thermodynamic equilibrium with matter, the time scale of energy transport in the Sun is longer, on the order of 30,000,000 years. This is the time it would take the Sun to return to a stable state if the rate of energy generation in its core were suddenly changed.

Neutrinos are also released by the fusion reactions in the core, but, unlike photons, they rarely interact with matter, so almost all are able to escape the Sun immediately. For many years measurements of the number of neutrinos produced in the Sun were lower than theories predicted by a factor of 3. This discrepancy was resolved in 2001 through the discovery of the effects of neutrino oscillation: the Sun emits the number of neutrinos predicted by the theory, but neutrino detectors were missing  of them because the neutrinos had changed flavor by the time they were detected.

Magnetic activity

The Sun has a stellar magnetic field that varies across its surface. The magnetic field varies in time and location. The quasi-periodic 11-year solar cycle is the most prominent variation in which the number and size of sunspots waxes and wanes.

The solar magnetic field extends well beyond the Sun itself. The electrically conducting solar wind plasma carries the Sun's magnetic field into space, forming what is called the interplanetary magnetic field. In an approximation known as ideal magnetohydrodynamics, plasma particles only move along the magnetic field lines. As a result, the outward-flowing solar wind stretches the interplanetary magnetic field outward, forcing it into a roughly radial structure. For a simple dipolar solar magnetic field, with opposite hemispherical polarities on either side of the solar magnetic equator, a thin current sheet is formed in the solar wind.

At great distances, the rotation of the Sun twists the dipolar magnetic field and corresponding current sheet into an Archimedean spiral structure called the Parker spiral. The interplanetary magnetic field is much stronger than the dipole component of the solar magnetic field. The Sun's dipole magnetic field of 50–400 μT (at the photosphere) reduces with the inverse-cube of the distance, leading to a predicted magnetic field of 0.1 nT at the distance of Earth. However, according to spacecraft observations the interplanetary field at Earth's location is around 5 nT, about a hundred times greater. The difference is due to magnetic fields generated by electrical currents in the plasma surrounding the Sun.

Sunspot 

Sunspots are visible as dark patches on the Sun's photosphere and correspond to concentrations of magnetic field where the convective transport of heat is inhibited from the solar interior to the surface. As a result, sunspots are slightly cooler than the surrounding photosphere, so they appear dark. At a typical solar minimum, few sunspots are visible, and occasionally none can be seen at all. Those that do appear are at high solar latitudes. As the solar cycle progresses towards its maximum, sunspots tend to form closer to the solar equator, a phenomenon known as Spörer's law. The largest sunspots can be tens of thousands of kilometers across.

An 11-year sunspot cycle is half of a 22-year Babcock–Leighton dynamo cycle, which corresponds to an oscillatory exchange of energy between toroidal and poloidal solar magnetic fields. At solar-cycle maximum, the external poloidal dipolar magnetic field is near its dynamo-cycle minimum strength, but an internal toroidal quadrupolar field, generated through differential rotation within the tachocline, is near its maximum strength. At this point in the dynamo cycle, buoyant upwelling within the convective zone forces emergence of the toroidal magnetic field through the photosphere, giving rise to pairs of sunspots, roughly aligned east–west and having footprints with opposite magnetic polarities. The magnetic polarity of sunspot pairs alternates every solar cycle, a phenomenon described by Hale's law.

During the solar cycle's declining phase, energy shifts from the internal toroidal magnetic field to the external poloidal field, and sunspots diminish in number and size. At solar-cycle minimum, the toroidal field is, correspondingly, at minimum strength, sunspots are relatively rare, and the poloidal field is at its maximum strength. With the rise of the next 11-year sunspot cycle, differential rotation shifts magnetic energy back from the poloidal to the toroidal field, but with a polarity that is opposite to the previous cycle. The process carries on continuously, and in an idealized, simplified scenario, each 11-year sunspot cycle corresponds to a change, then, in the overall polarity of the Sun's large-scale magnetic field.

Solar activity 

The Sun's magnetic field leads to many effects that are collectively called solar activity. Solar flares and coronal-mass ejections tend to occur at sunspot groups. Slowly changing high-speed streams of solar wind are emitted from coronal holes at the photospheric surface. Both coronal-mass ejections and high-speed streams of solar wind carry plasma and interplanetary magnetic field outward into the Solar System. The effects of solar activity on Earth include auroras at moderate to high latitudes and the disruption of radio communications and electric power. Solar activity is thought to have played a large role in the formation and evolution of the Solar System.

Long-term secular change in sunspot number is thought, by some scientists, to be correlated with long-term change in solar irradiance, which, in turn, might influence Earth's long-term climate. The solar cycle influences space weather conditions, including those surrounding Earth. For example, in the 17th century, the solar cycle appeared to have stopped entirely for several decades; few sunspots were observed during a period known as the Maunder minimum. This coincided in time with the era of the Little Ice Age, when Europe experienced unusually cold temperatures. Earlier extended minima have been discovered through analysis of tree rings and appear to have coincided with lower-than-average global temperatures.

In December 2019, a new type of solar magnetic explosion was observed, known as forced magnetic reconnection. Previously, in a process called spontaneous magnetic reconnection, it was observed that the solar magnetic field lines diverge explosively and then converge again instantaneously. Forced Magnetic Reconnection was similar, but it was triggered by an explosion in the corona.

Life phases

The Sun today is roughly halfway through the most stable part of its life. It has not changed dramatically for over four billion years and will remain fairly stable for more than five billion more. However, after hydrogen fusion in its core has stopped, the Sun will undergo dramatic changes, both internally and externally. It is more massive than 71 of 75 other stars within 5 pc, or in the top ~5 percent.

Formation

The Sun formed about 4.6 billion years ago from the collapse of part of a giant molecular cloud that consisted mostly of hydrogen and helium and that probably gave birth to many other stars. This age is estimated using computer models of stellar evolution and through nucleocosmochronology. The result is consistent with the radiometric date of the oldest Solar System material, at 4.567 billion years ago. Studies of ancient meteorites reveal traces of stable daughter nuclei of short-lived isotopes, such as iron-60, that form only in exploding, short-lived stars. This indicates that one or more supernovae must have occurred near the location where the Sun formed. A shock wave from a nearby supernova would have triggered the formation of the Sun by compressing the matter within the molecular cloud and causing certain regions to collapse under their own gravity. As one fragment of the cloud collapsed it also began to rotate due to conservation of angular momentum and heat up with the increasing pressure. Much of the mass became concentrated in the center, whereas the rest flattened out into a disk that would become the planets and other Solar System bodies. Gravity and pressure within the core of the cloud generated a lot of heat as it accumulated more matter from the surrounding disk, eventually triggering nuclear fusion.

The stars HD 162826 and HD 186302 share similarities with the Sun and are thus hypothesized to be its stellar siblings, formed in the same molecular cloud.

Main sequence

The Sun is about halfway through its main-sequence stage, during which nuclear fusion reactions in its core fuse hydrogen into helium. Each second, more than four million tonnes of matter are converted into energy within the Sun's core, producing neutrinos and solar radiation. At this rate, the Sun has so far converted around 100 times the mass of Earth into energy, about 0.03% of the total mass of the Sun. The Sun will spend a total of approximately 10 to 11  billion years as a main-sequence star before the red giant phase of the sun. At the 8 billion year mark, the sun will be at its hottest point according to the ESA's Gaia space observatory mission in 2022.

This occurs because the helium atoms in the core have a higher mean molecular weight than the hydrogen atoms that were fused, resulting in less thermal pressure. The core is therefore shrinking, allowing the outer layers of the Sun to move closer to the center, releasing gravitational potential energy. According to the virial theorem, half this released gravitational energy goes into heating, which leads to a gradual increase in the rate at which fusion occurs and thus an increase in the luminosity. This process speeds up as the core gradually becomes denser. At present, it is increasing in brightness by about 1% every 100 million years. It will take at least 1 billion years from now to deplete liquid water from the Earth from such increase. After that, the Earth will cease to be able to support complex, multicellular life and the last remaining multicellular organisms on the planet will suffer a final, complete mass extinction.

After core hydrogen exhaustion

The Sun does not have enough mass to explode as a supernova. Instead, when it runs out of hydrogen in the core in approximately 5 billion years, core hydrogen fusion will stop, and there will be nothing to prevent the core from contracting. The release of gravitational potential energy will cause the luminosity of the Sun to increase, ending the main sequence phase and leading the Sun to expand over the next billion years: first into a subgiant, and then into a red giant. The heating due to gravitational contraction will also lead to hydrogen fusion in a shell just outside the core, where unfused hydrogen remains, contributing to the increased luminosity, which will eventually reach more than 1,000 times its present luminosity. The Sun will spend around a billion years in the RGB and lose around a third of its mass.

After the red-giant branch, the Sun has approximately 120 million years of active life left, but much happens. First, the core (full of degenerate helium) ignites violently in the helium flash; it is estimated that 6% of the core—itself 40% of the Sun's mass—will be converted into carbon within a matter of minutes through the triple-alpha process. The Sun then shrinks to around 10 times its current size and 50 times the luminosity, with a temperature a little lower than today. It will then have reached the red clump or horizontal branch, but a star of the Sun's metallicity does not evolve blueward along the horizontal branch. Instead, it just becomes moderately larger and more luminous over about 100 million years as it continues to react helium in the core.

When the helium is exhausted, the Sun will repeat the expansion it followed when the hydrogen in the core was exhausted. This time, however, it all happens faster, and the Sun becomes larger and more luminous, engulfing Venus if it has not already. This is the asymptotic-giant-branch phase, and the Sun is alternately reacting hydrogen in a shell or helium in a deeper shell. After about 20 million years on the early asymptotic giant branch, the Sun becomes increasingly unstable, with rapid mass loss and thermal pulses that increase the size and luminosity for a few hundred years every 100,000 years or so.

According to a 2008 model, Earth's orbit will have initially expanded to at most  due to the Sun's loss of mass as a red giant. However, Earth's orbit will later start shrinking due to tidal forces (and, eventually, drag from the lower chromosphere) so that it is engulfed by the Sun during the tip of the red-giant branch phase, 3.8 and 1 million years after Mercury and Venus have respectively suffered the same fate. Models vary depending on the rate and timing of mass loss. Models that have higher mass loss on the red-giant branch produce smaller, less luminous stars at the tip of the asymptotic giant branch, perhaps only 2,000 times the luminosity and less than 200 times the radius. For the Sun, four thermal pulses are predicted before it completely loses its outer envelope and starts to make a planetary nebula. By the end of that phase—lasting approximately 500,000 years—the Sun will only have about half of its current mass.

The post-asymptotic-giant-branch evolution is even faster. The luminosity stays approximately constant as the temperature increases, with the ejected half of the Sun's mass becoming ionized into a planetary nebula as the exposed core reaches , as if it is in a sort of blue loop. The planetary nebula will disperse in about 10,000 years, but the white dwarf will survive for trillions of years before fading to a hypothetical black dwarf.

Motion and location

Solar System

The Sun has eight known planets orbiting around it. This includes four terrestrial planets (Mercury, Venus, Earth, and Mars), two gas giants (Jupiter and Saturn), and two ice giants (Uranus and Neptune). The Solar System also has nine bodies generally considered as dwarf planets and some more candidates, an asteroid belt, numerous comets, and a large number of icy bodies which lie beyond the orbit of Neptune. Six of the planets and many smaller bodies also have their own natural satellites: in particular, the satellite systems of Jupiter, Saturn, and Uranus are in some ways like miniature versions of the Sun's system.

The Sun is moved by the gravitational pull of the planets. The center of the Sun is always within 2.2 solar radii of the barycenter. This motion of the Sun is mainly due to Jupiter, Saturn, Uranus, and Neptune. For some periods of several decades, the motion is rather regular, forming a trefoil pattern, whereas between these periods it appears more chaotic. After 179 years (nine times the synodic period of Jupiter and Saturn), the pattern more or less repeats, but rotated by about 24°. The orbits of the inner planets, including of the Earth, are similarly displaced by the same gravitational forces, so the movement of the Sun has little effect on the relative positions of the Earth and the Sun or on solar irradiance on the Earth as a function of time.

Celestial neighbourhood

Galactic context

Observational history

Early understanding

The Sun has been an object of veneration in many cultures throughout human history. Humanity's most fundamental understanding of the Sun is as the luminous disk in the sky, whose presence above the horizon causes day and whose absence causes night. In many prehistoric and ancient cultures, the Sun was thought to be a solar deity or other supernatural entity. The Sun has played an important part in many world religions, as described in a later section.

In the early first millennium BC, Babylonian astronomers observed that the Sun's motion along the ecliptic is not uniform, though they did not know why; it is today known that this is due to the movement of Earth in an elliptic orbit around the Sun, with Earth moving faster when it is nearer to the Sun at perihelion and moving slower when it is farther away at aphelion.

One of the first people to offer a scientific or philosophical explanation for the Sun was the Greek philosopher Anaxagoras. He reasoned that it was not the chariot of Helios, but instead a giant flaming ball of metal even larger than the land of the Peloponnesus and that the Moon reflected the light of the Sun. For teaching this heresy, he was imprisoned by the authorities and sentenced to death, though he was later released through the intervention of Pericles. Eratosthenes estimated the distance between Earth and the Sun in the third century BC as "of stadia myriads 400 and 80000", the translation of which is ambiguous, implying either 4,080,000 stadia (755,000 km) or 804,000,000 stadia (148 to 153 million kilometers or 0.99 to 1.02 AU); the latter value is correct to within a few percent.

The theory that the Sun is the center around which the planets orbit was first proposed by the ancient Greek Aristarchus of Samos in the third century BC, and later adopted by Seleucus of Seleucia (see Heliocentrism). This view was developed in a more detailed mathematical model of a heliocentric system in the 16th century by Nicolaus Copernicus.

Development of scientific understanding 
Observations of sunspots were recorded during the Han Dynasty (206 BC–AD 220) by Chinese astronomers, who maintained records of these observations for centuries. Averroes also provided a description of sunspots in the 12th century. The invention of the telescope in the early 17th century permitted detailed observations of sunspots by Thomas Harriot, Galileo Galilei and other astronomers. Galileo posited that sunspots were on the surface of the Sun rather than small objects passing between Earth and the Sun.

Arabic astronomical contributions include Al-Battani's discovery that the direction of the Sun's apogee (the place in the Sun's orbit against the fixed stars where it seems to be moving slowest) is changing. (In modern heliocentric terms, this is caused by a gradual motion of the aphelion of the Earth's orbit). Ibn Yunus observed more than 10,000 entries for the Sun's position for many years using a large astrolabe.

From an observation of a transit of Venus in 1032, the Persian astronomer and polymath Ibn Sina concluded that Venus is closer to Earth than the Sun. In 1672 Giovanni Cassini and Jean Richer determined the distance to Mars and were thereby able to calculate the distance to the Sun.

In 1666, Isaac Newton observed the Sun's light using a prism, and showed that it is made up of light of many colors. In 1800, William Herschel discovered infrared radiation beyond the red part of the solar spectrum. The 19th century saw advancement in spectroscopic studies of the Sun; Joseph von Fraunhofer recorded more than 600 absorption lines in the spectrum, the strongest of which are still often referred to as Fraunhofer lines. The 20th century brought about several specialized systems for observing the sun, especially at different narrowband wavelengths, such as those using Calcium H (396.9 nm), K (393.37 nm) and Hydrogen-alpha (656.46 nm) filtering. 

In the early years of the modern scientific era, the source of the Sun's energy was a significant puzzle. Lord Kelvin suggested that the Sun is a gradually cooling liquid body that is radiating an internal store of heat. Kelvin and Hermann von Helmholtz then proposed a gravitational contraction mechanism to explain the energy output, but the resulting age estimate was only 20 million years, well short of the time span of at least 300 million years suggested by some geological discoveries of that time. In 1890 Joseph Lockyer, who discovered helium in the solar spectrum, proposed a meteoritic hypothesis for the formation and evolution of the Sun.

Not until 1904 was a documented solution offered. Ernest Rutherford suggested that the Sun's output could be maintained by an internal source of heat, and suggested radioactive decay as the source. However, it would be Albert Einstein who would provide the essential clue to the source of the Sun's energy output with his mass–energy equivalence relation . In 1920, Sir Arthur Eddington proposed that the pressures and temperatures at the core of the Sun could produce a nuclear fusion reaction that merged hydrogen (protons) into helium nuclei, resulting in a production of energy from the net change in mass. The preponderance of hydrogen in the Sun was confirmed in 1925 by Cecilia Payne using the ionization theory developed by Meghnad Saha. The theoretical concept of fusion was developed in the 1930s by the astrophysicists Subrahmanyan Chandrasekhar and Hans Bethe. Hans Bethe calculated the details of the two main energy-producing nuclear reactions that power the Sun. In 1957, Margaret Burbidge, Geoffrey Burbidge, William Fowler and Fred Hoyle showed that most of the elements in the universe have been synthesized by nuclear reactions inside stars, some like the Sun.

Solar space missions

The first satellites designed for long term observation of the Sun from interplanetary space were NASA's Pioneers 6, 7, 8 and 9, which were launched between 1959 and 1968. These probes orbited the Sun at a distance similar to that of Earth, and made the first detailed measurements of the solar wind and the solar magnetic field. Pioneer 9 operated for a particularly long time, transmitting data until May 1983.

In the 1970s, two Helios spacecraft and the Skylab Apollo Telescope Mount provided scientists with significant new data on solar wind and the solar corona. The Helios 1 and 2 probes were U.S.–German collaborations that studied the solar wind from an orbit carrying the spacecraft inside Mercury's orbit at perihelion. The Skylab space station, launched by NASA in 1973, included a solar observatory module called the Apollo Telescope Mount that was operated by astronauts resident on the station. Skylab made the first time-resolved observations of the solar transition region and of ultraviolet emissions from the solar corona. Discoveries included the first observations of coronal mass ejections, then called "coronal transients", and of coronal holes, now known to be intimately associated with the solar wind.

In the 1970s, much research focused on the abundances of iron-group elements in the Sun. Although significant research was done, until 1978 it was difficult to determine the abundances of some iron-group elements (e.g. cobalt and manganese) via spectrography because of their hyperfine structures. The first largely complete set of oscillator strengths of singly ionized iron-group elements were made available in the 1960s, and these were subsequently improved. In 1978, the abundances of singly ionized elements of the iron group were derived.
Various authors have considered the existence of a gradient in the isotopic compositions of solar and planetary noble gases, e.g. correlations between isotopic compositions of neon and xenon in the Sun and on the planets. Prior to 1983, it was thought that the whole Sun has the same composition as the solar atmosphere. In 1983, it was claimed that it was fractionation in the Sun itself that caused the isotopic-composition relationship between the planetary and solar-wind-implanted noble gases.

In 1980, the Solar Maximum Mission probes was launched by NASA. This spacecraft was designed to observe gamma rays, X-rays and UV radiation from solar flares during a time of high solar activity and solar luminosity. Just a few months after launch, however, an electronics failure caused the probe to go into standby mode, and it spent the next three years in this inactive state. In 1984 Space Shuttle Challenger mission STS-41C retrieved the satellite and repaired its electronics before re-releasing it into orbit. The Solar Maximum Mission subsequently acquired thousands of images of the solar corona before re-entering Earth's atmosphere in June 1989.

Launched in 1991, Japan's Yohkoh (Sunbeam) satellite observed solar flares at X-ray wavelengths. Mission data allowed scientists to identify several different types of flares and demonstrated that the corona away from regions of peak activity was much more dynamic and active than had previously been supposed. Yohkoh observed an entire solar cycle but went into standby mode when an annular eclipse in 2001 caused it to lose its lock on the Sun. It was destroyed by atmospheric re-entry in 2005.

One of the most important solar missions to date has been the Solar and Heliospheric Observatory, jointly built by the European Space Agency and NASA and launched on 2 December 1995. Originally intended to serve a two-year mission, a mission extension through 2012 was approved in October 2009. It has proven so useful that a follow-on mission, the Solar Dynamics Observatory, was launched in February 2010. Situated at the Lagrangian point between Earth and the Sun (at which the gravitational pull from both is equal), SOHO has provided a constant view of the Sun at many wavelengths since its launch. Besides its direct solar observation, SOHO has enabled the discovery of a large number of comets, mostly tiny sungrazing comets that incinerate as they pass the Sun.

All these satellites have observed the Sun from the plane of the ecliptic, and so have only observed its equatorial regions in detail. The Ulysses probe was launched in 1990 to study the Sun's polar regions. It first traveled to Jupiter, to "slingshot" into an orbit that would take it far above the plane of the ecliptic. Once Ulysses was in its scheduled orbit, it began observing the solar wind and magnetic field strength at high solar latitudes, finding that the solar wind from high latitudes was moving at about 750 km/s, which was slower than expected, and that there were large magnetic waves emerging from high latitudes that scattered galactic cosmic rays.

Elemental abundances in the photosphere are well known from spectroscopic studies, but the composition of the interior of the Sun is more poorly understood. A solar wind sample return mission, Genesis, was designed to allow astronomers to directly measure the composition of solar material.

 Solar Terrestrial Relations Observatory (STEREO) mission was launched in October 2006. Two identical spacecraft were launched into orbits that cause them to (respectively) pull further ahead of and fall gradually behind Earth. This enables stereoscopic imaging of the Sun and solar phenomena, such as coronal mass ejections.
 Solar Orbiter mission (SolO) was launched in 2020 and will reach a minimum perihelion of 0.28 AU, making it the closest satellite with sun-facing cameras.
CubeSat for Solar Particles (CuSP) was launched as a rideshare on Artemis 1 on 16 November 2022 to study particles and magnetic fields.
 Indian Space Research Organisation has scheduled the launch of a  satellite named Aditya-L1 for 2023. Its main instrument will be a coronagraph for studying the dynamics of the solar corona.

Unsolved problems

Coronal heating 

The temperature of the photosphere is approximately 6,000 K, whereas the temperature of the corona reaches . The high temperature of the corona shows that it is heated by something other than direct heat conduction from the photosphere.

It is thought that the energy necessary to heat the corona is provided by turbulent motion in the convection zone below the photosphere, and two main mechanisms have been proposed to explain coronal heating. The first is wave heating, in which sound, gravitational or magnetohydrodynamic waves are produced by turbulence in the convection zone. These waves travel upward and dissipate in the corona, depositing their energy in the ambient matter in the form of heat. The other is magnetic heating, in which magnetic energy is continuously built up by photospheric motion and released through magnetic reconnection in the form of large solar flares and myriad similar but smaller events—nanoflares.

Currently, it is unclear whether waves are an efficient heating mechanism. All waves except Alfvén waves have been found to dissipate or refract before reaching the corona. In addition, Alfvén waves do not easily dissipate in the corona. Current research focus has therefore shifted towards flare heating mechanisms.

Faint young Sun 

Theoretical models of the Sun's development suggest that 3.8 to 2.5 billion years ago, during the Archean eon, the Sun was only about 75% as bright as it is today. Such a weak star would not have been able to sustain liquid water on Earth's surface, and thus life should not have been able to develop. However, the geological record demonstrates that Earth has remained at a fairly constant temperature throughout its history and that the young Earth was somewhat warmer than it is today. One theory among scientists is that the atmosphere of the young Earth contained much larger quantities of greenhouse gases (such as carbon dioxide, methane) than are present today, which trapped enough heat to compensate for the smaller amount of solar energy reaching it.

However, examination of Archaean sediments appears inconsistent with the hypothesis of high greenhouse concentrations. Instead, the moderate temperature range may be explained by a lower surface albedo brought about by less continental area and the lack of biologically induced cloud condensation nuclei. This would have led to increased absorption of solar energy, thereby compensating for the lower solar output.

Observation by eyes

The brightness of the Sun can cause pain from looking at it with the naked eye; however, doing so for brief periods is not hazardous for normal non-dilated eyes. Looking directly at the Sun (sungazing) causes phosphene visual artifacts and temporary partial blindness. It also delivers about 4 milliwatts of sunlight to the retina, slightly heating it and potentially causing damage in eyes that cannot respond properly to the brightness. Long-duration viewing of the direct Sun with the naked eye can begin to cause UV-induced, sunburn-like lesions on the retina after about 100 seconds, particularly under conditions where the UV light from the Sun is intense and well focused.

Viewing the Sun through light-concentrating optics such as binoculars may result in permanent damage to the retina without an appropriate filter that blocks UV and substantially dims the sunlight. When using an attenuating filter to view the Sun, the viewer is cautioned to use a filter specifically designed for that use. Some improvised filters that pass UV or IR rays, can actually harm the eye at high brightness levels. Brief glances at the midday Sun through an unfiltered telescope can cause permanent damage.

During sunrise and sunset, sunlight is attenuated because of Rayleigh scattering and Mie scattering from a particularly long passage through Earth's atmosphere, and the Sun is sometimes faint enough to be viewed comfortably with the naked eye or safely with optics (provided there is no risk of bright sunlight suddenly appearing through a break between clouds). Hazy conditions, atmospheric dust, and high humidity contribute to this atmospheric attenuation.

An optical phenomenon, known as a green flash, can sometimes be seen shortly after sunset or before sunrise. The flash is caused by light from the Sun just below the horizon being bent (usually through a temperature inversion) towards the observer. Light of shorter wavelengths (violet, blue, green) is bent more than that of longer wavelengths (yellow, orange, red) but the violet and blue light is scattered more, leaving light that is perceived as green.

Religious aspects

Solar deities play a major role in many world religions and mythologies. Worship of the Sun was central to civilizations such as the ancient Egyptians, the Inca of South America and the Aztecs of what is now Mexico. In religions such as Hinduism, the Sun is still considered a god, he is known as Surya Dev. Many ancient monuments were constructed with solar phenomena in mind; for example, stone megaliths accurately mark the summer or winter solstice (some of the most prominent megaliths are located in Nabta Playa, Egypt; Mnajdra, Malta and at Stonehenge, England); Newgrange, a prehistoric human-built mount in Ireland, was designed to detect the winter solstice; the pyramid of El Castillo at Chichén Itzá in Mexico is designed to cast shadows in the shape of serpents climbing the pyramid at the vernal and autumnal equinoxes.

The ancient Sumerians believed that the Sun was Utu, the god of justice and twin brother of Inanna, the Queen of Heaven, who was identified as the planet Venus. Later, Utu was identified with the East Semitic god Shamash. Utu was regarded as a helper-deity, who aided those in distress, and, in iconography, he is usually portrayed with a long beard and clutching a saw, which represented his role as the dispenser of justice.

From at least the Fourth Dynasty of Ancient Egypt, the Sun was worshipped as the god Ra, portrayed as a falcon-headed divinity surmounted by the solar disk, and surrounded by a serpent. In the New Empire period, the Sun became identified with the dung beetle, whose spherical ball of dung was identified with the Sun. In the form of the sun disc Aten, the Sun had a brief resurgence during the Amarna Period when it again became the preeminent, if not only, divinity for the Pharaoh Akhenaton.

The Egyptians portrayed the god Ra as being carried across the sky in a solar barque, accompanied by lesser gods, and to the Greeks, he was Helios, carried by a chariot drawn by fiery horses. From the reign of Elagabalus in the late Roman Empire the Sun's birthday was a holiday celebrated as Sol Invictus (literally "Unconquered Sun") soon after the winter solstice, which may have been an antecedent to Christmas. Regarding the fixed stars, the Sun appears from Earth to revolve once a year along the ecliptic through the zodiac, and so Greek astronomers categorized it as one of the seven planets (Greek planetes, "wanderer"); the naming of the days of the weeks after the seven planets dates to the Roman era.

In Proto-Indo-European religion, the Sun was personified as the goddess *Seh2ul. Derivatives of this goddess in Indo-European languages include the Old Norse Sól, Sanskrit Surya, Gaulish Sulis, Lithuanian Saulė, and Slavic Solntse. In ancient Greek religion, the sun deity was the male god Helios, who in later times was syncretized with Apollo.

In the Bible, Malachi 4:2 mentions the "Sun of Righteousness" (sometimes translated as the "Sun of Justice"), which some Christians have interpreted as a reference to the Messiah (Christ). In ancient Roman culture, Sunday was the day of the sun god. It was adopted as the Sabbath day by Christians who did not have a Jewish background. The symbol of light was a pagan device adopted by Christians, and perhaps the most important one that did not come from Jewish traditions. In paganism, the Sun was a source of life, giving warmth and illumination to mankind. It was the center of a popular cult among Romans, who would stand at dawn to catch the first rays of sunshine as they prayed. The celebration of the winter solstice (which influenced Christmas) was part of the Roman cult of the unconquered Sun (Sol Invictus). Christian churches were built with an orientation so that the congregation faced toward the sunrise in the East.

Tonatiuh, the Aztec god of the sun, was usually depicted holding arrows and a shield and was closely associated with the practice of human sacrifice. The sun goddess Amaterasu is the most important deity in the Shinto religion, and she is believed to be the direct ancestor of all Japanese emperors.

See also

 
 
 
 Circled dot other uses of the Sun symbol and similar symbols

Notes

References

Further reading

External links

 Nasa SOHO (Solar and Heliospheric Observatory) satellite
 National Solar Observatory
 Astronomy Cast: The Sun
 A collection of spectacular images of the Sun from various institutions (The Boston Globe)
 Satellite observations of solar luminosity
 Sun|Trek, an educational website about the Sun
 The Swedish 1-meter Solar Telescope, SST
 An animated explanation of the structure of the Sun  (University of Glamorgan)
 Animation – The Future of the Sun
 Solar Conveyor Belt Speeds Up – NASA – images, link to report on Science
 Sun in Ultra High Definition NASA 11 January 2015
 Album of images and videos by Seán Doran, based on SDO imagery
 NASA 5-year timelapse video of the Sun
 NASA 10-year timelapse video of the Sun

 
Articles containing video clips
Astronomical objects known since antiquity
G-type main-sequence stars
Light sources
Plasma physics
Space plasmas
Sun